Andrew Ellison (born 5 July 1945 in Finchley, London, England) is an English musician and vocalist, best known as the frontman in John's Children, Jet and Radio Stars.

He attended Box Hill School in Surrey, where he met Chris Townson.

John's Children also featured Marc Bolan and Chris Townson. A song sung by Ellison, "It's Been A Long Time", appears on the soundtrack to the film, Here We Go Round the Mulberry Bush. "It's Been A Long Time" also featured on the compilation album, Backtrack 1, a Track Records release featuring The Who and Jimi Hendrix amongst others.

Jet released an album on CBS Records in 1975, toured as support to Hunter-Ronson and then became Radio Stars, who had one UK Top 40 hit, "Nervous Wreck" in early 1978. It peaked at No. 39. The B-side to the single was a cover of Marc Bolan's "Horrible Breath", a John's Children staple.

Discography
Cornflake Zoo – solo singles, demos, and rarities – CD – Voiceprint VP364CD Release date: 11 September 2006 
"You Can't Do That" (Lennon–McCartney)
"Cornflake Zoo"
"Hippy Gumbo" (Marc Bolan)
"It's Been A Long Time"
"Casbah Candy"
"Help!" (Lennon–McCartney)
"Fool From Upper Eden"
"Lucky Lie"
"Train In My Head"
"To The Beat of A Different Drummer"
"Life's Too Short"
"Hurt Myself"
"She's So Dissatisfied"
"Something She Said"
"Heather Lane"
"Anyway Goodbye"

Fourplay – self-published, 2008. CD-R EP featuring four new solo recordings written, recorded and produced by Ellison in 2007.
"Anyway Goodbye"
"She's Trying To Kill Me"
"Cold Light"
"Cluster Bombs"

References

External links
Official site

Living people
1945 births
People from Finchley
People from Leatherhead
English pop singers
English male singers
People educated at Box Hill School